Multnomah University (MU) is a private Christian university in Portland, Oregon. Composed of a college, seminary, graduate school, and online distance-learning program, the university offers bachelor's, master's and doctorate degrees, as well as professional certifications and endorsements.

History
On February 14, 1936, John G. Mitchell called a meeting of Portland-area ministers and Christian businessmen to discuss the idea of creating a Bible school in the Pacific Northwest. Mitchell, working with B.B. Sutcliffe, Willard Aldrich, and others, founded Multnomah School of the Bible that year.

The following October, classes began with 49 students and a half-dozen faculty in a former mortuary.

The first president was B.B. Sutcliffe who served in that role from 1936 to 1939. In 1943, Willard Aldrich became president of the school. At 34, he was the youngest president of a college in the United States. Willard served as president up until his retirement in 1978. During his time as president, Multnomah came to reside on its current campus and became a degree-granting college.

Willard's son, Joseph C. Aldrich, followed in his father's footsteps and became the next president of Multnomah. He was affectionately referred to as Joe.

The Multnomah Graduate School of Ministry was founded as a related institution in 1986 and was renamed later to Multnomah Biblical Seminary. In 1993, the college was renamed Multnomah Bible College. On July 1, 2008, the name of the institution was changed to Multnomah University.

Multnomah University was granted an exception to Title IX in 2016 that allows it to legally discriminate against LGBT students. University policy states that humans should have sex only within heterosexual marriage.

Campus locations 

The original campus was located adjacent to the site of the present Lloyd Center shopping mall in Northeast Portland. In 1952, the school purchased the 17-acre (69,000 m²) former campus of the Oregon Blind Trades School, a branch of the Oregon State School for the Blind, located at NE 82nd Avenue and NE Glisan Street, and the university's main campus still remains there today.

In 2008, Multnomah announced a satellite campus in Reno, Nevada. Reno students could choose from a bachelor's degree in Bible and theology or graduate degrees in Bible, theology, or church leadership. Multnomah's Reno campus was also home to Reno Technology Academy, which exists to resolve the information technology labor shortage in Northern Nevada by providing industry certifications. The Reno campus was permanently closed at the end of 2020.

Rankings 
In 2009, Multnomah University was named among the top 25 non-profits to work at in Oregon. The Seattle Met, in their 2008 rankings of Northwest colleges, put Multnomah as #6 in the region.

Ministries 
Over its history, Multnomah has been the starting point of several independent ministries and businesses, including: Mission Portland, International Renewal Ministries, and Multnomah Press (now Waterbrook-Multnomah Publishing Group, which no longer has any connection to Multnomah University).

Academics 

Multnomah offers bachelor's, master's and doctorate degrees, as well as professional certifications and endorsements.

Undergraduate program 
Historically, Multnomah University required all undergraduate students to major in Bible and Theology and choose a second major after that. The required major in Bible and Theology has since been dropped for a much less robust "Biblical Core."   
 
MU's Summit program allows students to earn a Bachelor of Arts (BA) in Bible and Theology and a Master of Divinity (M.Div.) in just five years instead of seven. The university also offers two TESOL certificate options for people wanting to teach English to speakers of other languages.

Graduate school 
Multnomah Graduate School offers four Master of Arts (MA) programs. There is also an online version of the Master of Arts in Global Development and Justice degree that kicks off with two weeks of classes in Rwanda or Thailand before transitioning to fully online classes. There is also an online version of the MA in TESOL degree.

Seminary 

Students at Multnomah Biblical Seminary are offered a standard track (for those without formal Bible and theology education) and an advanced track (for those with formal Bible and theology training) that eliminates one year of graduate studies.

Students in the seminary program are allowed the opportunity for learning in the classroom and practical application through Multnomah's internship program. Pastoral mentors work with students to help in their ministry training by providing guidance, experience, and constructive feedback.

The seminary also offers a doctoral program, the Doctor of Ministry (D.Min.), which offers several specialized tracks, including: Cross-Cultural Engagement, Contextual Leadership, Global Evangelism, and Youth Ministry.

Online degrees  
Multnomah University offers online bachelor's degrees, online graduate degrees, and online seminary degrees.

Athletics 
The Multnomah athletic teams are called the Lions. The university is a member of the National Association of Intercollegiate Athletics (NAIA), primarily competing in the Cascade Collegiate Conference (CCC) since the 2015–16 academic year.

Multnomah competes in 12 intercollegiate varsity sports: Men's sports include basketball, cross country, golf, lacrosse, soccer and track & field; while women's sports include and basketball, cross country, lacrosse, soccer, track & field and volleyball. Former sports included women's golf.

Men's basketball 
The men's basketball team holds the NAIA record for three-pointers taken in a game (79) and three-pointers made in a game (29).

Notable people

Alumni

 Ferdinand Waldo Demara, subject of the movie The Great Impostor
 Bettie Page, American model
 Dan Kimball, author
 Luis Palau, evangelist, author
 Linda Chaikin, author of Christian fiction

Faculty
 Bruce Wilkinson, author of The Prayer of Jabez, founder of Walk Thru the Bible

References

External links

 
 Official athletics website

 
1936 establishments in Oregon
Association for Biblical Higher Education
Bible colleges
Educational institutions established in 1936
Seminaries and theological colleges in Oregon
Universities and colleges accredited by the Northwest Commission on Colleges and Universities
Universities and colleges in Portland, Oregon